Estrilda is a genus of estrildid finch in the family Estrildidae.

Most of the genus is found in Africa with one species, the Arabian waxbill, ranging into Asia.

Some species are kept as pets and have been accidentally introduced to various parts of the world.

Taxonomy
The genus Estrilda was introduced in 1827 by the English naturalist William John Swainson with the common waxbill as the type species. The name of the genus is from astrild, the specific epithet of the common waxbill that was introduced by Carl Linnaeus in 1758.

Species
The genus contains 11 species:

The genus formerly contained other species with "waxbill" in their common name that are now placed in the genera Coccopygia, Brunhilda and Glaucestrilda.

References

 
Waxbills
Bird genera
Estrildidae
 
 
Taxonomy articles created by Polbot